Peter Rede (1373 – c. 1414) was the member of Parliament for the constituency of Dover for the parliament of 1410.

References 

Members of the Parliament of England for Dover
English MPs 1410
1373 births
1410s deaths
Year of death uncertain